Clinton Village Historic District may refer to:

Clinton Village Historic District (Clinton, Connecticut), listed on the NRHP in Connecticut
Clinton Village Historic District (Clinton, New York), listed on the NRHP in New York

See also
Clinton (disambiguation)